The 2009 Luxemburgish plan for the housing sector is a program developed by the government of Luxembourg with the help of several other bodies in order to improve the housing problem in Luxembourg. It has been created in accordance with the IVL document. It aims at achieving lower land prices and higher urban densities while maintaining the same quality of life.

Notes

References 

Government of Luxembourg
2009 in Luxembourg